Adérito Waldemar Alves Carvalho (born 4 July 1981), commonly known as Dedé, is an Angolan former professional footballer who played as a midfielder.

Club career
Dedé was born in Lobito, Angola. After starting in his native country with Académica Petróleos do Lobito, Dedé moved to Portugal, first appearing with lowly O Elvas C.A.D. and C.D. Portosantense. In the 2006–07 season he joined C.D. Trofense in the second division, being an important first-team member.

Dedé signed with F.C. Paços de Ferreira for 2007–08, scoring in his debut in the Primeira Liga on 18 August 2007 after heading home in a 1–3 away loss against C.S. Marítimo. It was his only goal during the campaign.
 
In the summer of 2009, Dedé signed for AC Arles-Avignon in the French Ligue 2, but left the club only a few months later and moved to Romania with FC Timişoara. He make his official debut for the latter on 25 April 2010, at FC Steaua București.

Dedé joined his third team in less than one year in the 2010 off-season, Cyprus' Olympiakos Nicosia. He continued competing in the country in the following years, with AEL Limassol.

International career
Dedé first represented Angola in 2007, being summoned for the following year's Africa Cup of Nations as the national side progressed through the group stages.

References

External links

1981 births
Living people
People from Benguela Province
Angolan footballers
Association football midfielders
Girabola players
Académica Petróleos do Lobito players
S.L. Benfica (Luanda) players
Primeira Liga players
Liga Portugal 2 players
Segunda Divisão players
O Elvas C.A.D. players
C.D. Trofense players
F.C. Paços de Ferreira players
Ligue 2 players
AC Arlésien players
Liga I players
FC Politehnica Timișoara players
Cypriot First Division players
Olympiakos Nicosia players
AEL Limassol players
Angola international footballers
2008 Africa Cup of Nations players
2010 Africa Cup of Nations players
2012 Africa Cup of Nations players
2013 Africa Cup of Nations players
Angolan expatriate footballers
Expatriate footballers in Portugal
Expatriate footballers in France
Expatriate footballers in Romania
Expatriate footballers in Cyprus
Angolan expatriate sportspeople in Portugal
Angolan expatriate sportspeople in France
Angolan expatriate sportspeople in Romania
Angolan expatriate sportspeople in Cyprus